Wheelerigobius is a genus of gobies native to the eastern Atlantic Ocean. The name of this genus honours the British ichthyologist Alwyne C. Wheeler (1929-2005) who was the curator of Fishes at the British Museum (Natural History).

Species
There are currently two recognized species in this genus:
 Wheelerigobius maltzani (Steindachner, 1881)
 Wheelerigobius wirtzi P. J. Miller, 1988 (Cameroon goby)

References

Gobiidae
Taxa named by Peter J. Miller